Celaenorrhinus kasai is a species of butterfly in the family Hesperiidae. It is found in the Democratic Republic of the Congo.

Subspecies
Celaenorrhinus kasai kasai (Democratic Republic of the Congo: Kasai, Tshuapa and Sankuru)
Celaenorrhinus kasai kapangana Berger, 1976 (Democratic Republic of the Congo: Katanga)

References

Butterflies described in 1956
kasai
Endemic fauna of the Democratic Republic of the Congo